Cleghorn and Claghorn are Scottish surnames that may refer to:

People 
 Archibald Scott Cleghorn (1835–1910), Scottish businessman who married into Hawaiian royal family 
 Daughter: Victoria Kaiulani Cleghorn (1875–1899), Crown Princess of Hawaii
 Edward J. Claghorn (1856–1936), granted first patent for seat belts in 1885
 Elizabeth Gaskell, English novelist, biographer, and short story writer, née Elizabeth Cleghorn Stevenson
 George Cleghorn (Scottish physician) (1716–1789) physician, and teacher at Dublin University
 George Claghorn (1748–1824), American patriot and master shipwright who oversaw construction of the USS Constitution ("Old Ironsides")
 Harold Cleghorn (1912–1996), New Zealand weightlifter
 Sir Hugh Cleghorn (colonial administrator) (1752–1837), colonial secretary to British Ceylon
 Hugh Francis Cleghorn (1820–1895), physician, botanist, forest conservationist and the colonial administrator's grandson
 Isabel Cleghorn (1852–1922), British educationist and suffragist
 John Cleghorn (born 1941), Canadian businessman
 Kate Claghorn (1864–1938), American Progressive Era scholar and activist
 Sarah Norcliffe Cleghorn (1876–1959), US author and social reformer known for her four-line satiric poem, "The Golf Links"
 William Cleghorn (1718–1754), British philosopher
 William Cleghorn (Newcastle eccentric) (1777–1860), last of the old eccentrics of Newcastle upon Tyne

Places 
 Cleghorn, Scotland, small village near Lanark, South Lanarkshire
 Cleghorn Glen, site of special scientific interest near Cleghorn, Scotland
 Cleghorn, Iowa, small city in the United States
 Cleghorn Lakes Wilderness California
 Claghorn, Pennsylvania, ghost town in the United States
 Cleghorn, Wisconsin, unincorporated

Fiction 
 Senator Claghorn, character on The Fred Allen Show
 Foghorn Leghorn, American animated character that was based on Senator Claghorn

Surnames of Scottish origin